Kenneth Fry may refer to:

 Ken Fry (1920–2007), Member of the Australian House of Representatives
 Kenneth Fry (cricketer) (1883–1949), English cricketer